The Spider's Web is a 1938 Columbia Pictures movie serial based on the popular pulp magazine character The Spider. The first episode of this 15-chapter serial was double-length and directed by serial and western specialist Ray Taylor and by comedy and serial veteran James W. Horne; it was the fifth of the 57 serials released by Columbia.

Plot
"The Octopus," a masked crime lord, is bent on crippling America with a wave of terror. He demands tribute from railroad magnates and other captains of industry. Richard Wentworth (Warren Hull), an amateur criminologist who is friendly with the police and is secretly "The Spider," a masked vigilante, is equally determined to destroy the Octopus and his gang. Pleasant and smiling in civilian life, Wentworth is frequently ruthless as The Spider, using his two .45 semi-automatic pistols against any public enemies who attack him. The Spider uses a knotted rope to swing about similar to Marvel Comics' Spider-Man will years later.

Wentworth also masquerades as affable underworld lowlife Blinky McQuade. Disguised as McQuade, Wentworth can infiltrate gangland as a hired gun or getaway-car driver and keep current on the mob's illegal activities.

The only people who know Wentworth's various identities are his assistants Jackson (Richard Fiske) and Ram Singh (Kenne Duncan), his butler Jenkins (Don Douglas), and his fiancée Nita (Iris Meredith).

The Octopus was a pulp villain written by Norvell Page, who also wrote most of The Spider pulp novels. He is garbed completely in white and is only ever seen by his henchmen while sitting in his throne-like chair. Unlike the pulps, where The Spider is dressed in an all black cape, mask, suit, and wide-brimmed fedora, in the serial he is garbed in a black suit and fedora, but with white web-like markings on his lightweight cape and full face mask. The serial follows the standard formula of fights, shoot-outs, Wentworth's friends being kidnapped at various times and needing to be rescued. Each chapter ends with The Spider or his friends in deep trouble, often about to be killed, but the effect is spoiled by a trailer for the next episode which follows, showing them rescued and continuing to fight the villains. The secret headquarters of The Octopus is found by The Spider in the final chapter; he has unwittingly given himself away to Wentworth and realizing this, Wentworth must now die; but as The Spider, Wentworth is triumphant in the end, unmasking The Octopus and ending his national reign of terror.

During the serial The Spider (like Marvel Comics much later Spider-Man) uses his web line a number of times to get out of trouble. Commissioner Kirk (changed from Kirkpatrick in the pulps) suspects that Wentworth is The Spider during one chapter. The Octopus' gang, like their boss, wear robes when they gather together in his presence. The Octopus ruthlessly executes all who failed him; in case of trouble, The Octopus always uses a false arm and hand, which allowed him to conceal a pistol in his real hand hidden beneath his robes.

Cast

Warren Hull as The Spider/Richard Wentworth/Blinky McQuade
Iris Meredith as Nita Van Sloan
Richard Fiske as Jackson
Kenne Duncan as Ram Singh
Forbes Murray as Commissioner Stanley Kirk
Don Douglas as Jenkins (butler)
Marc Lawrence as Steve Harmon, henchman
Charles C. Wilson as Chase
John Tyrrell as Grafton, henchman
Nestor Paiva as Red, henchman
Eugene Anderson Jr. as Johnnie Sands
Gordon Hart as J. Mason
Ann Doran as Mason's secretary
Paul Whitney as Gray (banker)
Beatrice Curtis as Kate Sands
Victor Travers as Theater Manager
Bess Flowers as Myrtle Aka Myrtle Muray
Byron Foulger as Allen Roberts

Stunts
Dave O'Brien
George DeNormand
Bud Geary
Tom Steele
Francis Walker 
Duke York

Production
The Spider's Web was the first serial to be adapted from a pulp magazine.  The original pulp magazine stories were too violent for the motion picture production code, but The Spider's Web "did manage to suggest [their] frantic pace".  Some changes were made beyond toning down the violence. The Spider's costume, a hood/mask and flowing cape with a spiderweb pattern motif, was more theatrical than either the description or illustrations in the Spider's pulp magazine. Historically, The Spider's early cover appearances depict him dressed in black with a black fedora and domino mask. Beginning with the pulp's sixth issue in 1934, The Spider employed horror makeup consisting of a "fright wig", fangs, a false hooked nose, and a hunchback. Commissioner Kirkpatrick was slightly changed to Commissioner Kirk "for no good reason". The serial release coincided with Superman (comics) and Green Hornet (radio) going nationwide.

Reception
The Spider's Web was wildly successful when first released in 1938; it was the most popular serial of that year, according to a tally published in The Motion Picture Herald,  and was such an exhibitor favorite that Columbia used it to launch a series of reissues in 1947. A sequel, The Spider Returns, was released in 1941; of the Spider's Web principal actors, only Warren Hull and Kenne Duncan returned in their original roles for the sequel.

Chapter titles

 Night of Terror
 Death Below
 High Voltage
 Surrender or Die
 Shoot to Kill
 Sealed Lips
 Shadows of the Night
 While the City Sleeps
 Doomed
 Flaming Danger
 The Road to Peril
 The Spider Falls
 The Manhunt
 The Double Cross
 The Octopus Unmasked
Source:

See also
 The Spider Returns (1941)
List of film serials by year
List of film serials by studio

References

External links
 
 

1938 films
1930s crime films
1930s English-language films
1930s vigilante films
American black-and-white films
Columbia Pictures film serials
Films directed by James W. Horne
Films directed by Ray Taylor
Films based on American novels
Films based on thriller novels
American superhero films
American crime films
Films with screenplays by George H. Plympton
1930s American films